Monique Coupat (born 16 April 1955) is a French rower. She competed in the women's quadruple sculls event at the 1988 Summer Olympics.

References

External links
 

1955 births
Living people
French female rowers
Olympic rowers of France
Rowers at the 1988 Summer Olympics
Place of birth missing (living people)